Ellerburn  is a village in the Ryedale district of North Yorkshire, England, situated near Thornton-le-Dale, about  east of Pickering. It is located in the North York Moors National Park.

History

The tiny hamlet of Ellerburn was formerly an industrial area with paper mills and quarries. There is an ancient church, a Grade II listed building, which can boast some unconventional vicars.  One in the 18th century stole stones to restore the church;  another in the following century seems to have regularly fallen into the adjacent Thornton Beck and held services dripping wet.

The Church of St Hilda
The original church of St Hilda building dates to the early Norman period, and according to some sources, to the Saxon era, as early as 850 or 1050. A number of carved stones from the 9th to 10th centuries incorporated in the walls.  Four of the stones can be found to the left of the porch.  A beautifully carved Anglo-Scandinavian style cross can be found on the south wall of the nave. The font is 11th century on a modern base.

The church was restored and modified in 1904–1905 and in 1911. During restoration an early building was found as well as an ancient altar stone which was reinstalled.

This church is similar in style and age to St Gregory's Minster in Kirkdale.

References

External links

Villages in North Yorkshire